Shieldaig Island is an island in Loch Shieldaig, in the council area of Highland, Scotland. Its area is 13 hectares and its 134 feet high. Shieldaig Island has been the property of the National Trust for Scotland since 1970 and has a thriving bird population. It is almost entirely covered in Scots pine which was thought to have been planted over 100 years ago. The seeds were probably taken from Speyside.

References 

National Trust for Scotland properties
Islands of Highland (council area)
Sites of Special Scientific Interest in Scotland